Aida Esteve Quintero (born 12 March 2001) is a Spanish footballer who plays as a midfielder for Madrid CFF in the Spanish Liga F.

Club career
Esteve started her career at Espanyol's academy.

References

External links
Profile at La Liga

2001 births
Living people
Women's association football midfielders
Spanish women's footballers
People from Vallès Occidental
Sportspeople from the Province of Barcelona
Footballers from Catalonia
Sportswomen from Catalonia
RCD Espanyol Femenino players
FC Barcelona Femení B players
SD Eibar Femenino players
Primera División (women) players
Segunda Federación (women) players
Spain women's youth international footballers